Laura Elisa Romero Jara (born 23 March 1990) is a Paraguayan footballer who plays as a forward for Argentine club San Lorenzo de Almagro and the Paraguay women's national team.

Club career
Romero started in Olimpia. In 2012, she moved to Sportivo Luqueño.

International career
Romero made her senior debut for Paraguay on 7 November 2019, in a 1–2 home friendly loss to Argentina.

References

1990 births
Living people
Women's association football forwards
Paraguayan women's footballers
Sportspeople from Luque
Paraguay women's international footballers
Club Olimpia footballers
Sportivo Luqueño players
Club Atlético River Plate (women) players
Cerro Porteño players
Club Sol de América footballers
San Lorenzo de Almagro (women) players
Paraguayan expatriate women's footballers
Paraguayan expatriate sportspeople in Argentina
Expatriate women's footballers in Argentina
Paraguayan expatriate sportspeople in Brazil
Expatriate women's footballers in Brazil
21st-century Paraguayan women
20th-century Paraguayan women